BEQ is an abbreviation for:

 Bachelor Enlisted Quarters, which are buildings on U.S. Military bases for quartering enlisted personnel (as opposed to BOQ (Bachelor Officer Quarters) used by unmarried commissioned officers.
 Brendan Emmett Quigley, an American crossword puzzle constructor
 Business Ethics Quarterly, a scholarly journal sponsored by the Society for Business Ethics
 The IATA code for RAF Honington
 Bioanalytical equivalent, a measure of potency estimates in cell bioassays